Vizhay is a rural locality (a settlement) in Gornozavodsky District, Perm Krai, Russia. The population was 207 as of 2010. There are 13 streets.

References 

Rural localities in Gornozavodsky District